Regina Häusl (born 17 December 1973 in Bad Reichenhall) is a German former alpine skier who competed in the 1992 Winter Olympics, 1998 Winter Olympics, and 2002 Winter Olympics.

External links
 sports-reference.com

1973 births
Living people
People from Bad Reichenhall
Sportspeople from Upper Bavaria
Olympic alpine skiers of Germany
Alpine skiers at the 1992 Winter Olympics
Alpine skiers at the 1998 Winter Olympics
Alpine skiers at the 2002 Winter Olympics
FIS Alpine Ski World Cup champions
German female alpine skiers
21st-century German women